Same-sex marriage in Pennsylvania has been legally recognized since May 20, 2014, when a U.S. federal district court judge ruled that the state's 1996 statutory ban on recognizing same-sex marriage was unconstitutional. Governor Tom Corbett announced the following day that he would not appeal the decision. Pennsylvania had previously prohibited the recognition of same-sex marriage by statute since 1996, but had never added such a ban to its State Constitution.

Pennsylvania has never recognized civil unions or domestic partnerships, and was the last U.S. state in the Northeastern United States to legalize same-sex marriage, and the 19th state overall.

Legal history

Statutory ban
On May 8, 1996, Representative Allan Egolf introduced legislation to the Pennsylvania House of Representatives to ban same-sex marriages and refuse to recognize marriages performed in other states. The bill bypassed the House Judiciary Committee in the hopes of speeding its passage before the next election. On June 28, the House considered a bill to amend Pennsylvania statutes to allow for grandparents to adopt grandchildren over the objections of their parents. Representative Egolf introduced an amendment to this bill that paralleled his anti-marriage bill. The Republican-controlled House voted to add this anti-marriage amendment to the adoption bill. The vote on the amendment was 177–16. An effort to rule it unconstitutional failed by a vote of 171 to 29. The bill, which had already passed the Senate, was sent back for a concurrence vote. After this vote, the House recessed for the summer. On October 1, the Republican-controlled Senate voted 43–5 to concur with the anti-marriage language added by the House. Governor Tom Ridge signed the act into law on October 8. The legislation was passed the same year as the federal Defense of Marriage Act (DOMA;) was passed into law by the United States Congress.

Representative Malcolm Kenyatta introduced a bill to repeal the ban in 2021, but it failed to pass before the end of the legislative session.

Efforts to recognize same-sex marriage
Several attempts to recognize same-sex marriages failed in the General Assembly, but failed while the Republican Party had majorities in either the Senate or House of Representatives.

Legislation to extend marriage rights to same-sex couples by amending the statute has been introduced in the General Assembly several times. In May 2009, Senator Daylin Leach introduced such a bill in the Senate. Representative Babette Josephs also introduced a similar bill in the House of Representatives. Both bills remained in committee, and died at the end of the legislative session. In March 2013, Senator Leach introduced Senate Bill 719, and in June 2013 representatives Brian Sims and Steve McCarter introduced a same-sex marriage bill in the House, following the U.S. Supreme Court's ruling in United States v. Windsor. Both bills died at the end of the legislative session, however.

Attempts at constitutional ban
In Pennsylvania, a constitutional amendment requires approval by both chambers of the General Assembly in two successive two-year sessions by majority vote before going to voters in a referendum.

In 2006, five state representatives, with Representative Scott W. Boyd as a main sponsor, introduced House Bill 2381, proposing an amendment to the Constitution of Pennsylvania defining marriage as "the union of one man and one woman". The bill had 87 cosponsors and was approved on June 6, 2006 on a vote of 136–61. The Senate approved the bill 38–12 on June 21, 2006. It was referred to the Rules Committee in the House of Representatives on June 22, 2006, where no action was taken.

In 2008, a similar bill with Senator Mike Brubaker as its main sponsor, Senate Bill 1250, was approved by the Senate Judiciary Committee. It would have banned same-sex marriage and its "functional equivalent". This language led to debate on whether the bill would not only ban same-sex marriage and civil unions, but also prevent hospital visitation, employer health care benefits and recognition of a will for same-sex couples. The bill was laid on the table on May 6, 2008 because the House of Representatives would not allow it to be considered by the State Government Committee in a timely manner. Senator Brubaker requested the bill be laid aside. The Senate agreed to the motion by a voice vote.

In 2010, Senator John Eichelberger introduced Senate Bill 707 to ban same-sex marriages in the State Constitution. This proposed amendment failed in the Judiciary Committee, when all 5 Democrats and 3 Republicans voted to table the amendment against the opposition of 6 Republicans. On May 3, 2011, Representative Daryl Metcalfe introduced House Bill 1434 with 36 cosponsors. It was referred to the State Government Committee. The bill would have constitutionally banned same-sex marriage and any substantial equivalent. On March 13, 2012, opponents of the bill claimed victory when Metcalfe delayed a committee vote on the legislation. Metcalfe reintroduced the bill with 27 cosponsors on May 7, 2013, the lowest number of cosponsors the bill had had when introduced. The measure was unsuccessful and died at the end of the legislative session.

Federal court challenges

Whitewood v. Wolf

On July 9, 2013, following the U.S. Supreme Court's decision in United States v. Windsor, the American Civil Liberties Union (ACLU) filed a lawsuit in the U.S. District Court for the Middle District of Pennsylvania on behalf of 23 plaintiffs—10 couples, 2 of their children, and a widow—seeking to overturn Pennsylvania's 1996 statutory ban on same-sex marriage. Attorney General Kathleen Kane, a named defendant, said that she would not defend the statute, but Governor Tom Corbett announced he would. On May 20, 2014, Judge John E. Jones III ruled that Pennsylvania's same-sex marriage ban violated the Constitution of the United States. The ruling was not stayed and same-sex couples in Pennsylvania could request and receive marriage licenses immediately and marry after a mandatory 3-day waiting period. Anticipating legal maneuvers to stay Jones' ruling, dozens of same-sex couples applied for marriage licenses the same day and some obtained waivers of the state's three-day waiting period. The first couple to marry, Jess Garrity and Pamela VanHaitsma, did so on May 21 in Pittsburgh. Governor Corbett announced on May 21 that he would not appeal Judge Jones' decision, effectively making Pennsylvania the 19th U.S. state to recognize same-sex marriage.

The Schuylkill County Clerk of Orphans' Court, responsible for responding to marriage license applications, Theresa Santai-Gaffney, repeatedly sought to intervene to defend the statute without success. She was rebuffed by Judge Jones, the Third Circuit Court of Appeals, U.S. Supreme Court Associate Justice Samuel Alito, and again by the Third Circuit. The president of the Pennsylvania Family Institute decried the court ruling, "What Judge Jones has done is extralegal, going beyond what the law or the constitution requires and the fact that he is allowing, or apparently allowing, same-sex marriage licenses to be distributed immediately undermines the Democratic process." The ACLU issued the following statement, "Another wonderful day for liberty and justice for all in Pennsylvania." Attorney General Kane said, "Our commonwealth progressed today and so have the hopes and dreams of many who suffer from inequality. Today, in Pennsylvania, the constitution prevailed." Senator Bob Casey Jr. also welcomed the court decision, "This was the right decision and is a step forward for equality in our commonwealth and in the nation."

Palladino v. Corbett
On September 26, 2013, a same-sex couple lawfully married in Massachusetts filed suit in the U.S. District Court for the Eastern District of Pennsylvania, seeking to require that Pennsylvania recognize out-of-state marriages between same-sex partners as valid. The couple also sought a declaration that the statute outlawing in-state same-sex marriage be declared unconstitutional. The case was assigned to U.S. District Judge Mary A. McLaughlin. The defendants, Governor Corbett and Attorney General Kane, filed motions to dismiss that November and December, respectively, with the plaintiffs responding in January 2014. The case was styled Palladino v. Corbett after first-named defendant Governor Corbett. On January 17, 2014, a group called the Philadelphia Metro Task Force, opposed to same-sex marriage recognition in Pennsylvania, sought to intervene in the lawsuit. This group alleged that, in allowing same-sex marriage, "reverse discrimination is threatened amidst a continual omission of religious and moral freedom." Judge McLaughlin denied the group's motion to intervene on March 4, 2014, because they "do not identify a sufficient interest they might have at stake in this litigation, nor do they demonstrate why their interests are not adequately represented by an existing party." She also denied the group amicus curiae status, meaning they could not file a brief as a non-party to the case.

Oral arguments for summary judgment in the case were held on May 15. The case was rendered moot on May 21 when Governor Corbett decided not to appeal the decision in Whitewood v. Wolf, and as a result, same-sex marriage commenced throughout Pennsylvania. On both May 22 and 28, Judge Mary McLaughlin ordered the plaintiff couples to show cause why their case should not be dismissed because of mootness. Judge McLaughlin issued an order on September 8 suspending further proceedings until "expiration of the deadline to petition the U.S. Supreme Court for a writ of certiorari in Whitewood." After the Whitewood decision allowed the Palladino plaintiffs to lawfully marry in Pennsylvania, and the state defendants stipulated "that they will take no steps to deprive Plaintiffs of the benefits accorded by the validity and recognition of their marriage under Pennsylvania law", Judge McLaughlin ordered the case voluntarily dismissed as moot on October 22, 2014.

State court challenges

DeSanto v. Barnsley
In 1981, John DeSanto sued his former partner William Barnsley, claiming in DeSanto v. Barnsley that since Pennsylvania recognized common-law marriages, their long-term relationship should likewise be recognized as such. In May 1984, the Superior Court of Pennsylvania ruled against him and dismissed the case, stating that the issue was a matter for the General Assembly to decide.

Commonwealth v. Hanes, Cucinotta v. Commonwealth, and Ballen v. Wolf
In July 2013, shortly after Attorney General Kathleen Kane declined to defend Pennsylvania's prohibition of same-sex marriage in U.S. district court, D. Bruce Hanes, the Montgomery County Register of Wills and Clerk of Orphans' Court, announced he would issue marriage licenses to same-sex couples. He interpreted his Orphans' Court's position as a judicial one and found that denying same-sex couples marriage licenses as the statutes required would violate their rights under the State Constitution. Between July 24 and August 9, 2013, he issued marriage licenses to more than 100 same-sex couples. A week later, the Pennsylvania Department of Health filed a lawsuit with the Commonwealth Court to enjoin Hanes from issuing any more such licenses.

The lead state court case was Commonwealth v. Hanes. Oral arguments were held on September 4, 2013. On September 12, 2013, Judge Dan Pellegrini ordered Hanes to stop issuing marriage licenses to same-sex couples "[u]nless and until either the General Assembly repeals or suspends the Marriage Law provisions or a court of competent jurisdiction orders that the law is not to be obeyed or enforced". Hanes had issued 174 licenses to same-sex couples before the court issued its order. He appealed the decision to the Supreme Court of Pennsylvania. Couples that received a marriage license from Hanes filed an amicus curiae brief on his behalf with the Supreme Court on December 2, 2013. In the brief, the couples noted that the court never ruled on the substantive issue of same-sex marriage.

On September 6, 2013, in Cucinotta v. Commonwealth, a same-sex couple in Chester County filed a petition with the Commonwealth Court asking the court to find Pennsylvania's restrictions on same-sex marriage unconstitutional. On September 25, 2013, a group of 42 individuals who were married with licenses issued by Montgomery County Clerk Hanes petitioned the Commonwealth Court in Ballen v. Corbett, later restyled Ballen v. Wolf, after the parties agreed that the respondent would be Pennsylvania's Secretary of Health Michael Wolf instead of Governor Corbett. The petitioners sought to overturn the state's same-sex marriage ban on the grounds that it violated both the state and federal constitutions.

The cases pending in the Commonwealth Court were rendered moot on May 21 when Governor Corbett decided not to appeal the decision in Whitewood v. Wolf, which left in place the order ending enforcement of Pennsylvania's denial of marriage rights to same-sex couples. On September 30, Judge Dan Pellegrini approved an agreement between the parties in Ballen v. Wolf and ordered the case dismissed. The agreement provided that the Ballen petitioners and similarly-situated intervening parties are married under state law as of the May 20 order in Whitewood, even though the petitioners had received marriage licenses from Clerk Hanes and/or solemnized their marriages before that date.

Economic impact
A study from the University of California, Los Angeles (UCLA) found that allowing same-sex couples to marry in Pennsylvania would add nearly $100 million to the state's economy. Total spending related to weddings and wedding-related tourism would account for up to $92 million in the first three years, and state and local tax revenues were expected to increase by up to $5 million. Additionally, up to 1,142 new full-time and part-time jobs were expected to be created by the additional economic activity.

Demographics and marriage statistics
The Pennsylvania Department of Health records the number of marriages performed each year, but does not distinguish between different-sex and same-sex marriages in its data.

A 2016 study by the United States Department of the Treasury showed that Philadelphia, Harrisburg, Pittsburgh, Lancaster and Allentown were the Pennsylvania cities with the highest percentage of same-sex marriages in the state. 2017 estimates from the United States Census Bureau showed that there were about 32,700 same-sex households in Pennsylvania. This represented an increase compared to 2016 (about 32,400 households), 2015 (about 31,400 households) and 2014 (about 28,700 households). The bureau estimated that 58.6% of same-sex couples living in the state in 2017 were married.

Public opinion
An April 2011 Public Policy Polling (PPP) survey found that when Pennsylvania voters were asked to choose between same-sex marriage, civil unions, or no legal recognition of same-sex relationships, 30% supported same-sex marriage, 33% supported civil unions, and 35% opposed all legal recognition. 2% were undecided. A July 2011 PPP survey found that 38% of Pennsylvania voters thought that same-sex marriage should be legal, while 51% thought it should be illegal and 11% were not sure. In a separate question offering voters the option of civil unions, 32% supported same-sex marriage, 36% supported civil unions, and 31% opposed all legal recognition. 1% were unsure. A November 2011 survey by the same polling organization found that 36% of Pennsylvania voters thought same-sex marriage should be legal, while 52% thought it should be illegal and 12% were not sure. In a separate question offering voters the option of civil unions, 29% supported same-sex marriage, 35% supported civil unions, and 33% opposed all legal recognition, while 1% were not sure. A May 2012 PPP survey found that 39% of Pennsylvania voters thought same-sex marriage should be legal, while 48% thought it should be illegal and 13% were unsure. Offered the option of civil unions, 35% supported same-sex marriage, 33% supported civil unions, and 28% opposed all legal recognition. 3% were unsure.

An August 2011 Franklin & Marshall survey found that 50% of Pennsylvania respondents supported a constitutional amendment to legalize same-sex marriage, while 42% opposed it and 8% were not sure. A separate question on the same survey found that 62% of respondents supported a law legalizing civil unions for same-sex couples, while 34% opposed it and 5% were not sure. A June 2012 Franklin & Marshall survey found that 48% of Pennsylvania respondents supported a constitutional amendment to legalize same-sex marriage, while 49% were against such an amendment, an increase of 6% in support since 2009. A separate question on the same survey found that 63% of respondents favored a law legalizing civil unions for same-sex couples, while 33% were against such a law, an increase in support of 5% since 2009.

A September 2012 Muhlenberg College survey found that 44% of Pennsylvania respondents supported same-sex marriage being legal, while 45% wanted same-sex marriage to be illegal, with 11% undecided. A January 2013 Quinnipiac University poll showed that 47% supported same-sex marriage, while 43% were opposed to the idea. The poll also found that white Catholics supported same-sex marriage by a 50–40 margin, while white Protestants opposed same-sex marriage by a 60–31 margin. A January 29–February 3, 2013 Franklin & Marshall poll found that 52% of Pennsylvania respondents supported same-sex marriage, while 41% were opposed.

A March 2013 PPP survey found that 45% of Pennsylvania voters supported same-sex marriages, while 47% were opposed. Asked on the question of marriage or civil unions for same-sex couples in the state, over 74% of respondents indicated support for either (with 38% supporting marriage rights and 36% supporting civil unions but not marriage), with only 24% of respondents opposed to any civil recognition for same-sex couples. 2% were undecided. A May 2013 Franklin & Marshall poll found that 54% of Pennsylvania respondents supported same-sex marriage, while 41% were opposed. A survey conducted in December of the same year by the Public Religion Research Institute (PRRI) showed that 61% of Pennsylvania residents supported same-sex marriage, while 35% opposed, and 3% did not know or refused to answer. A February 2014 Quinnipiac University poll found that 57% of respondents supported same-sex marriage, 37% were opposed to the idea, and 6% did not know.

A May 2014 PPP survey found that 48% of Pennsylvania residents supported same-sex marriage being legal, while 44% wanted same-sex marriage to be illegal, and 9% were unsure. A November–December 2014 The Morning Call/Muhlenberg College poll found that 62% of respondents supported same-sex marriage, while 32% were opposed and 6% were undecided.

A 2015 PRRI survey showed that 55% of Pennsylvania residents supported same-sex marriage. According to the PRRI, support had increased to 60% in 2016. A 2017 survey by the same polling organization found that support for same-sex marriage had increased to 64%, with 27% of respondents being opposed and 9% being unsure or undecided. A PRRI survey conducted between March 8 and November 9, 2021 showed that 69% of Pennsylvania respondents supported same-sex marriage, while 24% opposed.

See also
LGBT rights in Pennsylvania
Same-sex marriage in the United States

References

LGBT in Pennsylvania
Pennsylvania law
Pennsylvania
2014 in LGBT history
2014 in Pennsylvania